The 2013–14 Cal State Bakersfield Roadrunners men's basketball team represented California State University, Bakersfield during the 2013–14 NCAA Division I men's basketball season. The Roadrunners were led by third year head coach Rod Barnes and played their home games at the Icardo Center and the Rabobank Arena. The Roadrunners competed as a new member of the Western Athletic Conference. They finished the season 13–19, 5–11 in WAC play to finish in a three-way tie for seventh place. They advanced to the semifinals of the WAC tournament where they lost to New Mexico State.

Roster

Schedule

|-
!colspan=9 style="background:#005DAA; color:#FFD200;"| Exitbition

|-
!colspan=9 style="background:#005DAA; color:#FFD200;"| Regular season

|-
!colspan=9 style="background:#005DAA; color:#FFD200;"| WAC tournament

References

Cal State Bakersfield Roadrunners men's basketball seasons
Cal State Bakersfield